The Politburo (abbreviation for Political Bureau) of the Polish United Workers Party (PUWP; , PZPR) was the chief executive body of the ruling communist apparatus in Poland between 1948 and 1989. Nearly all key figures had membership in the Politburo. The Politburo of the PUWP typically had between 9-15 full members at any one time. Usually, several alternate (or candidate) members were also elected to the Politburo, but unlike full members, alternate members did not possess full voting rights.

The predecessor of the PUWP, was the Polish Workers Party (Polish: Polska Partia Robotnicza). In 1948, it merged with the Polish Socialist Party to form the PUWP. A chronological list of Politburo membership is provided below.

Politburo of Polish Workers Party 1944–1948

Politburo of Polish United Workers Party 1948-1990

(A) = Alternate (Candidate) Member

References

 Politburo of the Polish United Workers' Party
Polish politicians
Polish United Workers' Party
Polish United Workers' Party